Frank L. Graham is a Canadian biologist, having been a Distinguished University Professor at McMaster University. 

Graham is the 1998 recipient of the Robert L. Noble Prize. 

Graham has performed research on gene therapy.

References

Year of birth missing (living people)
Living people
Canadian biologists
Academic staff of McMaster University